G.B.C. was an Italian and Swiss professional cycling team that existed from 1963 to 1977. Many highly successful riders rode for the team, including Wladimiro Panizza, Roberto Ballini and Rudi Altig.

In 1970, another team, Zimba merged into GBC.

The team was selected to race in eight editions of the Giro d'Italia, where they achieved one stage win by Roberto Ballini in 1969.

Major victories
Coppa Placci: Roberto Ballini (1969)
Rund um den Henninger Turm: Rudi Altig (1970)
Tour de Berne: Eric Spahn (1972)
Giro della Provincia di Reggio Calabria: Wladimiro Panizza (1973)
Giro di Romagna: Wladimiro Panizza (1973), Roberto Ceruti (1977)

References

Defunct cycling teams based in Italy
Defunct cycling teams based in Switzerland
1963 establishments in Italy
1977 disestablishments in Italy
Cycling teams established in 1963
Cycling teams disestablished in 1977